The Air Bud film series (also known as Disney Buddies) is an American film franchise based on a sports-playing Golden Retriever named Buddy, portrayed by Air Buddy. The franchise began in 1997 with the theatrical release of Air Bud, followed by the theatrical release of Air Bud: Golden Receiver in 1998. Following the box office failure of Golden Receiver, the rest of the films in the series were released in direct-to-video form. The Air Buddies or Disney Buddies spin-off series began in 2006 with the release of Air Buddies and it focuses on the adventures of Buddy's talking Golden Retriever puppies. The franchise features fourteen films (five of which were in the Air Bud series and seven in the Air Buddies series), in addition to two Christmas spin-offs of the Air Buddies series.

Disney Buddies is one of the top direct-to-DVD franchises, just behind Disney Fairies at $300 million, with the first 12 films grossing $220 million by March 2014.

History
Kevin DiCicco's Golden Retriever Buddy was featured on "America's Funniest Home Videos" and David Letterman's "Stupid Pet Tricks". He then (in 1991), approached the independent production company Keystone Entertainment to produce Air Bud, a film based on Buddy. He also formed his production company, Air Bud Productions, that year. Disney's Miramax was brought on as the distribution company. Keystone indicated that no sequel was planned. The film did well in the home video market.

By April 1998, DiCicco and Robert Vince, the film's producer at Keystone, had a falling out, as Keystone and Vince had gone forward with a sequel, Air Bud: Golden Receiver, without DiCicco, who also claimed he wasn't paid anything for the first film and that he owns the Air Bud rights (based on the name of this production company name).

DiCicco bred three offspring of Buddy and trained them for sports like Buddy. The puppies were signed to an endorsement deal by DiCicco for Milk-Bone dog biscuits for puppies. He intended to make his own sequel, Air Bud: The Next Generation, which was scheduled to start production in the fall of 1999, with its concept being a "cross between Ferris Bueller and Home Alone".

Disney and William Morris Agency were sued in December 2011 over the Santa Paws films being unauthorized copies of a 1991 script for Santa Paws: The Story of Santa's Dog.

Film series
Air Bud (1997) – Josh meets an abused Golden Retriever and finds out that he can play basketball.
Air Bud: Golden Receiver (1998) – Josh's Golden Retriever learns to play American football.
Air Bud: World Pup (2000) – Josh discovers that Buddy's ballplaying skills apply to soccer.
Air Bud: Seventh Inning Fetch (2002) – Buddy makes the baseball team and becomes a star player.
Air Bud: Spikes Back (2003) – Buddy tackles volleyball.

Spin-offs

Air Buddies series
The Air Buddies films were all direct-to-video releases and are considered spin-offs of the original series, focusing on Buddy's puppies.

Air Buddies (2006) – Buddy and Molly's offspring work together to help each other while attempting to rescue their parents.
Snow Buddies (2008) – The offspring of Buddy and Molly go on an Alaskan adventure.
Space Buddies (2009) – The Buddies tag along for a school field trip to the space museum and accidentally walk aboard a rocket ship.
Santa Buddies (2009) – The Buddies team up with Puppy Paws, the son of Santa Paws, to end the melting of a magical icicle threatening Christmas Eve.
Spooky Buddies (2011) – The Buddies are in a new adventure when Halloween hits Fernfield.
Treasure Buddies (2012) – The Buddies find themselves on an Indiana Jones style adventure.
Super Buddies (2013) – After acquiring rings that grant them superpowers, the Buddies must use them to stop a villainous alien dictator.

Santa Paws films
The Santa Paws films were produced as prequels to Santa Buddies.

The Search for Santa Paws (2010) – When Santa is in trouble, Paws has to save Christmas with the help of some friends.
Santa Paws 2: The Santa Pups (2012) – When the Christmas spirit begins to disappear, Mrs. Claus and the Santa Pups must race to save Christmas around the world.

Recurring cast and characters

Note: A dark gray cell indicates the character does not appear in the film.

Crew

See also
Gus (1976 film)
MVP: Most Valuable Primate (2000 film)

References

External links
Disney Buddies 

Air Bud (series)
Film series introduced in 1997
Walt Disney Studios (division) franchises
Disney direct-to-video films
Films about dogs
Films about animals playing sports